Gnathophis castlei, or Castle's conger, is an eel in the family Congridae (conger/garden eels). It was described by Emma Stanislavovna Karmovskaya and John Richard Paxton in 2000. It is a marine, deep water-dwelling eel which is known from Queensland, Australia, in the western central Pacific Ocean. It dwells at a depth range of 131–366 metres. Males can reach a total length of 34.2 centimetres.

Etymology
The species epithet refers to Peter Henry John Castle.

References

castlei
Taxa named by Emma Stanislavovna Karmovskaya
Taxa named by John Richard Paxton
Fish described in 2000